Alcidodes magnificus, is a species of weevil found in Sri Lanka.

Description 
This small, slender species has a body length is about 4.8 to 6 mm. Body blackish to reddish brown. Legs and antennae chestnut-brown whereas tarsi is blackish brown. Body clothed with dirty-yellow scales. Vertical stripes and transverse bands are consist of densely packed whitish-yellow scales. Pronotum with 3 longitudinal stripes, a narrow median stripe and one lateral stripe. The basal half of the elytral is very broad. Ventrum denser and covered with yellow scales. Proboscis longer than the pronotum, and cylindrical. Antennae not reaching the root of the proboscis. Pronotum broad and convex. Antescutellar flaps are flattened. Eye lobes are slightly protruding. Leg with a large, sharp, curved tooth.

References 

Curculionidae
Insects of Sri Lanka
Beetles described in 1960